Coalbank is a rural locality in the Toowoomba Region, Queensland, Australia. In the  Coalbank had a population of 30 people.

History 
Coalbank Provisional School opened on 1906. On 1 January 1909 it became Coalbank State School. It closed in 1961.

On Sunday 15 March 1931 Bishop James Byrne blessed and officially opened St James' Catholic Church.

In the  Coalbank had a population of 30 people.

References 

Toowoomba Region
Localities in Queensland